This article contains information about the literary events and publications of 1936.

Events

January 8 – Jewish booksellers throughout Nazi Germany are deprived of their Reich Publications Chamber membership cards, without which no one can sell books.
May – The Greek poet and Communist activist Yiannis Ritsos is inspired to write his poem Epitaphios by a photograph of a dead protester at a massive tobacco workers' demonstration in Thessaloniki. It is published soon after. In August, the right-wing dictatorship of Ioannis Metaxas comes to power in Greece and copies are burned publicly at the foot of the Acropolis in Athens.
May 16–17 – About 30 left-wing writers of the Second Polish Republic gather at the Lviv Anti-Fascist Congress of Cultural Workers.
August 3 – George Heywood Hill establishes the Heywood Hill bookshop in London's Mayfair.
August 18 – The 38-year-old Spanish dramatist, Federico García Lorca, is arrested by Francoist militia during the White Terror and never seen alive again. His brother-in-law, Manuel Fernández-Montesinos, the leftist mayor of Granada, is shot on the same day. Lorca's play The House of Bernarda Alba (La casa de Bernarda Alba), completed on June 19, will not be performed until 1945.
November 6 – After United States publication in 1934, the U.K. authorities decide they will not prosecute or seize copies of James Joyce's 1922 novel Ulysses.
November 23 – Life magazine begins to appear as a weekly news magazine in the United States, under the management of Henry Luce.
unknown dates
The first lighthearted crime novel by Scottish-born university teacher of English literature J. I. M. Stewart, writing as Michael Innes, is published: Death at the President's Lodging, set in Oxford. It introduces his long-running character Detective Inspector John Appleby of Scotland Yard.
The Carnegie Medal for excellence in children's literature is inaugurated by the Library Association in the United Kingdom. The first winner is Arthur Ransome for Pigeon Post.

New books

Fiction
Felipe Alfau – Locos: A Comedy of Gestures
Sutan Takdir Alisjahbana – Layar Terkembang (With Sails Unfurled)
Jorge Amado – Sea of Death (Mar Morto)
Eric Ambler – The Dark Frontier
Arturo Ambrogi – El Jetón
Nigel Balchin – Lightbody on Liberty
Djuna Barnes – Nightwood
Henry Bellamann – The Gray Man Walks
Stephen Vincent Benét – "The Devil and Daniel Webster" (short story, published in The Saturday Evening Post)
Georges Bernanos – The Diary of a Country Priest
Arna Bontemps – Black Thunder
Mary Borden - Action for Slander
Marjorie Bowen – The Poisoners
Carol Ryrie Brink – Caddie Woodlawn
 John Bude – The Sussex Downs Murder
Edgar Rice Burroughs – Tarzan's Quest
James M. Cain – Double Indemnity
Morley Callaghan – Now that April's Here and Other Stories
Karel Čapek – War with the Newts (Válka s mloky)
John Dickson Carr
The Arabian Nights Murder
The Punch and Judy Murders (as by Carter Dickson)
Willa Cather – Not Under Forty
Louis-Ferdinand Céline – Death on the Installment Plan (Mort à crédit)
Peter Cheyney – This Man Is Dangerous
Agatha Christie – Hercule Poirot novels
The A. B. C. Murders
Cards on the Table
Murder in Mesopotamia
Robert P. Tristram Coffin – John Dawn
Freeman Wills Crofts 
 The Loss of the Jane Vosper
 Man Overboard!
Carmen de Icaza – Cristina Guzmán
Henry de Montherlant – Les Jeunes Filles (The Young Girls; first part of tetralogy)
John Dos Passos – The Big Money
William Pène du Bois – Otto at Sea
Daphne du Maurier – Jamaica Inn
Walter D. Edmonds – Drums Along the Mohawk
Mircea Eliade – Miss Christina (Domnișoara Christina)
William Faulkner – Absalom, Absalom!
Gilbert Frankau – Farewell Romance
Konstantine Gamsakhurdia – Stealing the Moon
Anthony Gilbert – Murder by Experts
Jean Giono – Joy of Man's Desiring (Que ma joie demeure)
Maxim Gorky (posthumous) – The Life of Klim Samgin (the final fourth volume, unfinishes, translated as The Specter) 
Graham Greene – A Gun for Sale
Walter Greenwood – Standing Room Only
Winifred Holtby – South Riding
Aldous Huxley – Eyeless in Gaza
Michael Innes – Death at the President's Lodging
C. L. R. James – Minty Alley
Mikheil Javakhishvili – A Woman's Burden
Storm Jameson
None Turn Back (The Mirror in Darkness III)
In the Second Year
Arthur Joseph – Dark Metropolis
Margaret Kennedy – Together and Apart
Leo Kiacheli – Gvadi Bigva
Jonathan Latimer – The Lady in the Morgue
Jean de La Varende – Leather-Nose (Nez-de-Cuir)
Alexander Lernet-Holenia – Baron Bagge (Der Baron Bagge)
Haniel Long – Interlinear to Cabeza de Vaca
 E. C. R. Lorac 
 Crime Counter Crime
 A Pall for a Painter
 Post After Post-Mortem
Andrew Lytle – The Long Night
Compton Mackenzie – Figure of Eight
Klaus Mann – Mephisto
 Ngaio Marsh – Death in Ecstasy
A. E. W. Mason – Fire Over England
 Alan Melville – Death of Anton
Henry Miller – Black Spring
Gladys Mitchell – Dead Men's Morris
Margaret Mitchell – Gone with the Wind
Naomi Mitchison – The Fourth Pig
John A. Moroso – Nobody's Buddy
Anaïs Nin – House of Incest
George Orwell – Keep the Aspidistra Flying
John Cowper Powys – Maiden Castle
Premchand – Godaan (Gōdān, The Gift of a Cow)
Ellery Queen – Halfway House
Ayn Rand – We the Living
Erich Maria Remarque – Three Comrades (Drei Kameraden)
Kate Roberts – Traed mewn cyffion (Feet in the Stocks)
Rafael Sabatini – The Fortunes of Captain Blood
Sim Hun – Sangnoksu ("Evergreen (Tree)"; serialization concludes and book publication)
Israel Joshua Singer – The Brothers Ashkenazi (Di brider Ashkenazy, in book format)
Eleanor Smith – Portrait of a Lady
John Steinbeck – In Dubious Battle
Rex Stout – The Rubber Band
Cecil Street 
 Death at Breakfast
 Death in the Tunnel
 In Face of the Verdict
 Murder of a Chemist
Phoebe Atwood Taylor
The Crimson Patch
Out of Order
Frank Thiess – Tsushima
Aleksey Tolstoy – «Золотой ключик, или Приключения Буратино» (The Golden Key, or The Adventures of Buratino)
S. S. Van Dine – The Kidnap Murder Case
Vũ Trọng Phụng – Số đỏ (Dumb Luck)
 Henry Wade – Bury Him Darkly
Sylvia Townsend Warner – Summer Will Show
Carolyn Wells – Murder in the Bookshop
Ethel Lina White – The Wheel Spins (later The Lady Vanishes)
Francis Brett Young – Far Forest

Children and young people
Edward Ardizzone – Little Tim and the Brave Sea Captain (Journal d'un curé de campagne)
M. E. Atkinson – August Adventure
Carol Ryrie Brink – Caddie Woodlawn
Joanna Cannan – A Pony for Jean (first of nine Pony series books)
Noel Langley – The Tale of the Land of Green Ginger
Munro Leaf – The Story of Ferdinand
John A. Moroso – Nobody's Buddy
Carola Oman – Ferry the Fearless
Arthur Ransome – Pigeon Post
Ruth Sawyer – Roller Skates
Lester Basil Sinclair (as John Mystery) – Why Cows Moo
Noel Streatfeild – Ballet Shoes (illustrated by Ruth Gervis)
Barbara Euphan Todd – Worzel Gummidge (first in the Worzel Gummidge series of eleven books)
Aleksey Nikolayevich Tolstoy – The Golden Key, or the Adventures of Buratino

Drama
Pralhad Keshav Atre
Lagnāchi Bedi
Udyāchā Sansār
W. H. Auden and Christopher Isherwood – The Ascent of F6
S. N. Behrman – End of Summer
Charles Bennett – Page From a Diary
Bertolt Brecht – Round Heads and Pointed Heads (Die Rundköpfe und die Spitzköpfe)
Noël Coward
Tonight at 8.30
Present Laughter
Mazo de la Roche and Nancy Price – Whiteoaks
Henry de Montherlant – Pasiphaé
Harley Granville-Barker – Waste (first public performance, 1927 version; originally written 1906)
Ian Hay – The Frog
George S. Kaufman and Moss Hart – You Can't Take It with You
Sinclair Lewis and John C. Moffitt – It Can't Happen Here (dramatisation)
Federico García Lorca – The House of Bernarda Alba (La casa de Bernarda Alba; written)
Clare Boothe Luce – The Women
Barré Lyndon – The Amazing Dr. Clitterhouse
J. B. Priestley – Bees on the Boat Deck
Terence Rattigan – French Without Tears
Dorothy L. Sayers and Muriel St. Clare Byrne – Busman's Honeymoon: A Detective Comedy in Three Acts
Irwin Shaw – Bury the Dead
George Shiels
The Jailbird
The Passing Day
Ödön von Horváth
Don Juan kommt aus dem Krieg (Don Juan Comes Back From the War)
Figaro läßt sich scheiden (Figaro Gets a Divorce)

Poetry

W. H. Auden – Look, Stranger!
Gottfried Benn – Ausgewählte Gedichte (Selected Poems)
T. S. Eliot – Collected Poems 1909–35 including "Burnt Norton", first of the Four Quartets
Patrick Kavanagh – Ploughman, and Other Poems
Michael Roberts (ed.) – The Faber Book of Modern Verse
Dylan Thomas – Twenty-five Poems
W. B. Yeats (ed.) – The Oxford Book of Modern Verse 1892–1935

Non-fiction
A. J. Ayer – Language, Truth, and Logic
John Dickson Carr – The Murder of Sir Edmund Godfrey
Victor Hugo Green – The Negro Motorist Green Book (1st edn)
Graham Greene – Journey Without Maps
Richard Foster Jones – Ancients and Moderns: A Study of the Background of The Battle of the Books
Carl Gustav Jung – The Idea of Redemption in Alchemy (Die Erlösungsvorstellungen in der Alchemie)
John Maynard Keynes – The General Theory of Employment, Interest and Money
Osbert Lancaster – Progress at Pelvis Bay
F. R. Leavis – Revaluation: Tradition and Development in English Poetry
C. S. Lewis – The Allegory of Love
Karl Mannheim – Ideology and Utopia
Edwin Muir – Scott and Scotland
George Orwell – "Bookshop Memories"
Olavi Paavolainen – Kolmannen valtakunnan vieraana (Guest of the Third Reich)
J. R. R. Tolkien – "Beowulf: The Monsters and the Critics" (version of a lecture)

Births
January 5 – Florence King, American writer (died 2016) 
January 10 – Stephen E. Ambrose, American historian (died 2002)
January 28 – Ismail Kadare, Albanian novelist and poet
February 12 – Shawkat Ali, Bangladeshi writer (died 2018)
February 18 – Jean M. Auel, American historical novelist
March 1 – Jean-René Huguenin, French novelist and literary critic (died in 1962)
March 7 – Georges Perec, French novelist, filmmaker and essayist (died 1982)
March 28 – Peter Mayer, English-born publisher (died 2018)
March 31 – Marge Piercy, American poet and activist
April 30 – Viktor Likhonosov, Soviet Russian writer and editor
May 10 – Anthea Bell, English translator (died 2018)
May 23 – Ian Kennedy Martin, English scriptwriter and novelist
May 27 – Ivo Brešan, Croatian playwright, novelist, screenwriter and satirist (died 2016)
June 3
Duff Hart-Davis, English biographer and journalist
Larry McMurtry, American novelist, essayist and screenwriter (died 2021)
June 9 – Nell Dunn, English playwright and author
June 18 – Dick Wimmer, American novelist (died 2011)
June 23 – Richard Bach, American novelist and non-fiction writer
June 24 – J. H. Prynne, English poet
June 29 – David Rudkin, English playwright
July 5 – Valerie Flint, English medieval historian (died 2009)
July 6 – Abidullah Ghazi, Indian-American author, educator and poet
July 22 – Tom Robbins, American novelist
August 8 – Jan Pieńkowski, Polish-born British children's writer and illustrator (died 2022)
August 24 – A. S. Byatt, English novelist
September 1 – Roderick Thorp, American novelist (died 1999)
September 2 – Károly Krajczár, Hungarian Slovene teacher, writer and collector (died 2018)
September 20 – Andrew Davies, Welsh novelist and screenwriter
September 26 – Victor Watson, English children's writer and academic
October 1 – Kailayar Sellanainar Sivakumaran, Sri Lankan writer, art and literary critic, journalist and radio and TV personality
October 5 – Václav Havel, Czech dramatist and first president of Czech Republic (died 2011)
November 4 – C. K. Williams, American poet (died 2015)
November 17 – John Wells, English satirical writer and actor (died 1998)
November 18 – Suzette Haden Elgin, American science fiction writer (died 2015)
November 20 – Don DeLillo, American novelist
November 25 – William McIlvanney, Scottish novelist, short story writer and poet (died 2015)
November 27 – Dahlia Ravikovitch, Israeli poet (died 2005)
December 1 – Ma Văn Kháng, Vietnamese writer
December 2 – Hebe Uhart, Argentine writer (died 2018)
December 5
James Lee Burke, American writer
Lewis Nkosi, Zulu writer (died 2010)
December 11 – Ingvar Moe, Norwegian poet, novelist and children's writer (died 1993)
December 17 – Frank Martinus Arion, Curaçaoan novelist and poet (died 2015)

Deaths
January 4 – James Churchward, British writer (born 1851)
January 5 – Ramón del Valle-Inclán, Spanish dramatist and novelist (born 1866)
January 17 – Mateiu Caragiale, Romanian novelist and poet (stroke, born 1885)
January 18 – Rudyard Kipling, English writer and Nobel laureate (born 1865)
February 7 – Elizabeth Robins Pennell, American biographer and critic based in London (born 1855)
February 8 – Rahel Sanzara, German dancer, actress and novelist (cancer, born 1894)
February 23 – Lidia Veselitskaya (V. Mikulich), Russian novelist, memoirist and translator (born 1857)
March 1 – Mikhail Kuzmin, Russian poet, musician and novelist (born 1872)
March 9 – A. de Herz, Romanian playwright and journalist (hemoptysis, born 1887)
March 16 – Marguerite Durand, French actress and journalist (born 1864)
April 30 – A. E. Housman, English poet (born 1859)
June 11 – Robert E. Howard, American fantasy writer (suicide, born 1906)
June 12:
M. R. James, English ghost story writer and scholar (born 1862)
Karl Kraus, Austrian writer and journalist (born 1874)
June 14 – G. K. Chesterton, English novelist, poet and Catholic apologist (born 1874)
June 18 – Maxim Gorky, Russian dramatist (born 1868)
July 25 – Donald Maxwell, English travel writer and illustrator (born 1877)
July 26 – F. J. Harvey Darton English children's literature historian and publisher (born 1878)
August 8 – Mourning Dove, Native American writer (born 1884)
August 15 – Grazia Deledda, Sardinian-born novelist and Nobel laureate (born 1871)
August 19 – Federico García Lorca, Spanish dramatist and poet (shot, born 1898)
August 26 – Juliette Adam, French author (born 1836)
October 5 – J. Slauerhoff, Dutch poet and novelist (born 1898)
October 9 – Harriette A. Keyser, American industrial reformer (born 1841)
November 12 – Stefan Grabiński, Polish horror writer (born 1887)
December – Emma Sheridan Fry, American actor, playwright, and drama teacher (born 1864)
December 10 – Luigi Pirandello, Italian dramatist and novelist (born 1867)
December 24  – Frances Garnet Wolseley, 2nd Viscountess Wolseley, English horticulturist and garden writer (born 1872)
December 27 – Kristína Royová, Slovak novelist, religious writer and poet (born 1860)
December 28 – John Cornford, English poet (killed in action, born 1915)
December 31 – Miguel de Unamuno, Spanish novelist, poet and scholar (born 1864)
date unknown – Bertha M. Wilson, American playwright, critic and actress (born 1874)

Awards
Carnegie Medal for children's literature: Arthur Ransome, Pigeon Post
James Tait Black Memorial Prize for fiction: Winifred Holtby, South Riding
James Tait Black Memorial Prize for biography: Edward Sackville West, A Flame in Sunlight: The Life and Work of Thomas de Quincey
Newbery Medal for children's literature: Carol Ryrie Brink, Caddie Woodlawn
Nobel Prize in literature: Eugene Gladstone O'Neill
Prix Goncourt: Maxence Van Der Meersch, L'Empreinte de Dieu
Pulitzer Prize for Drama: Robert E. Sherwood, Idiot's Delight
Pulitzer Prize for Poetry: Robert P. Tristram Coffin, Strange Holiness
Pulitzer Prize for the Novel: Harold L. Davis, Honey in the Horn

References

 
Years of the 20th century in literature